Tinabinol (INN; SP-119) is a synthetic cannabinoid drug and analogue of dronabinol which was patented as an antihypertensive but was never marketed.

See also 
 Dronabinol
 Nabitan

References 

Phenols
Cannabinoids
Benzopyrans
Oxygen heterocycles
Sulfur heterocycles
Heterocyclic compounds with 3 rings